Manzoor Ahmad Malik was a retired Pakistani judge. He became the Lahore High Court judge in 2009 and was elevated to the Supreme Court in 2015. Malik had reported to hear and rule around 50,000 cases during his career and retired in 2021. He was known for cases related to criminal jurisprudence. Prior to retiring, he passed a judgement to stop the execution of inmates who were mentally ill. He also set up a free legal aid society. Malik was from Punjab.

References 

Year of birth missing (living people)
Living people
Supreme Court of Pakistan
Pakistani judges